Quercivir is a genus of beetles in the family Cerambycidae, containing the following species:

 Quercivir dohrni Lameere, 1912
 Quercivir gounellei Lameere, 1912

References

Prioninae